Mow is a Chinese surname shared by several notable people.

 Pang Tzu Mow, 毛邦初, (1904–1987), Chinese, Lt. General of the Republic of China Air Force
 William Mow, 毛昭寰, (b. 1936), Chinese—American, entrepreneur and founder of the clothing company Bugle Boy, son of Lt. General Mow
 Van C. Mow, 毛昭憲, (b. 1939), Chinese—American, biomechanics pioneer, son of Lt. General Mow

In these cases, the origin is through the Chinese hanzi 毛, where the use as a surname derives from the feudal title translated as "Earl Mao", establishing a relationship between the surnames "Mao" and "Mow" as having the same origin.

Another origin is through the traditional Chinese hanzi 憲, which has several meanings as both a verb and a noun.

References